Ki Je Koriis a 1976 Bangladeshi film directed by Zahirul Haque. It stars Razzak and Bobita. Razzak earned his first Bangladesh National Film Award for Best Actor for his performance in the film.

Synopsis
Shahana Chowdhury, a witty lady marries Badshah, a man convicted of murder to win his grandfather's properties. But all her efforts end in smoke when the man is acquitted of his charges.

Music
The film's music is composed by Alam Khan and the lyrics are written by Mukul Chowdhury. The songs are sung by Sabina Yasmin and Mohammad Ali Siddiqui.

Awards
2nd Bangladesh National Film Awards
Best Actor - Razzak

References

External links

1976 films
Bengali-language Bangladeshi films
1970s Bengali-language films